Joe Bob Smith (October 27, 1934 – December 18, 2011) was an American-born Canadian football player who played for the Edmonton Eskimos. He previously played football at the University of Houston.

References

Edmonton Elks players
1934 births
2011 deaths